Thorvaldson Lake is a fresh water lake in Northern Saskatchewan, named after Thorbergur Thorvaldson in 1966.

See also
List of lakes of Saskatchewan

References

Lakes of Saskatchewan